Nataliya Nikolayevna Razumova (born November 21, 1961) is a former volleyball player for the USSR. Born in Revda, Sverdlovsk Oblast, she competed for the Soviet Union at the 1980 Summer Olympics.

References

External links
 Профиль на сайте «Спорт на Урале» 
 

1961 births
Living people
Soviet women's volleyball players
Olympic volleyball players of the Soviet Union
Olympic gold medalists for the Soviet Union
Olympic medalists in volleyball
Medalists at the 1980 Summer Olympics
Volleyball players at the 1980 Summer Olympics
People from Revda, Sverdlovsk Oblast
Honoured Masters of Sport of the USSR
Sportspeople from Sverdlovsk Oblast